Lady Six Monkey (Mixtec: Ñuñuu Dzico-Coo-Yodzo; 1073-1100), was a queen regnant of the Mixtec city State of Huachino in 1090-1100. She was the ruler of Huachino as the co-ruler of her spouse, king Lord Eleven Wind of Huachino. She was also the heir to the throne of the city state of Jaltepec, as the daughter of queen regnant Lady Nine Wind of Jaltepec, in 1073-1100, but she died before she could succeed her mother. She is described in many contemporary documents, notably the Codex Selden.

References

Elin Sand: Woman Ruler: Woman Rule
 Robert Lloyd Williams, Lord Eight Wind of Suchixtlan and the Heroes of Ancient Oaxaca: Reading
 Mesoamerican Manuscripts: New Scientific Approaches and Interpretations

1100 deaths
1073 births
11th-century women rulers
Mixtec people